The Mausoleum of Rabiya Sultan Begim is a reconstruction of a late 15th-century monument in the city of Turkistan, now in southern Kazakhstan. The mausoleum fell into disrepair and was demolished in 1896. A crypt was rediscovered under the ruins in the 1950s, and the structure was reconstructed in 1980.

Rabiya Sultan Begim was the daughter of the Timurid sultan Ulugh Beg (1394–1449), and so the great-granddaughter of the Timurid dynasty's founder Timur (Tamerlane; 1336–1405). In 1451 she became the fourth wife of Abu'l-Khayr Khan (1412–1468), ruler of the Uzbek Khanate, whose grandson Muhammad Shaybani founded the Shaybanid Khanate of Bukhara, later the Emirate of Bukhara, which survived until 1920. Towards the end of her life she lived in the city of Yasi, now known as Turkistan, where the mausoleum was constructed after her death in 1485.

The structure was a typical of the Timurid period: a main octagonal structure of brick with arched recesses on each façade, topped by a cylindrical drum and dome both decorated with ceramic tiles, and a square brick entrance block facing northwest towards the larger Mausoleum of Khoja Ahmed Yasawi.

References

 Rabïya Sultan Begim Mausoleum, XV C., azretsultan.kz
 Mausoleum of Rabigha-Sultan Begum, Lonely Planet

15th-century religious buildings and structures
Mausoleums in Kazakhstan
Timurid Empire
Turkistan Region